Nor Ashkharh (Նոր Աշխարհ in Armenian meaning New World) is a Greek-Armenian bilingual newspaper established in Athens, Greece. It is the official political organ of the Armenian Democratic Liberal Party (Ramgavar party) in Greece.

Nor Ashkharh is published weekly in Armenian.

Armenian-language newspapers
Greek-language newspapers
Weekly newspapers published in Greece
Newspapers published in Athens
Armenian Democratic Liberal Party